Antonino is an Italian masculine given name that is a form of Antonio, as well as a surname. Below is a list of notable people with the name.

Given name
Antonino Arconte (born 1954), Italian writer and former secret agent
Antonino Asta (born 1970), Italian footballer and manager
Antonino Barges (fl. 1546–1565), Franco-Flemish composer of the Renaissance, active in Venice and Treviso
Antonino Barillà (born 1988), Italian footballer
Antonino Barillà (sport shooter) (born 1987), Italian sports shooter
Antonino Bernardini, (born 1974) Italian footballer and manager
Antonino Bonaccorsi (1826–1897), Italian painter
Antonino Bonvissuto (born 1985), Italian footballer
Antonino Borzì (1852–1921), Italian botanist
Antonino Bruschetta (born 1962), Italian actor, film and stage director, and screenwriter. 
Antonino Calcagnadoro (1876–1935), Italian painter
Antonino Calderone (1935–2013), Sicilian Mafioso
Antonino Caltabiano (born 1955), Italian wrestler
Antonino Caponnetto (1920–2002), Italian Antimafia magistrate
Antonino Cassarà (1947–1985), Italian policeman assassinated by the Cosa Nostra
Antonino Catalano (1932–1987), Italian racing cyclist
Antonino Cayetano (born 1979) Mexican politician
Antonino da Patti (16th century), Sicilian priest
Antonino D'Agata (1882–1947), Italian politician
Antonino D'Agostino (born 1978), Italian footballer
Antonino Daì (born 1984), Italian footballer
Antonino D'Ambrosio (born 1971), American author and filmmaker
Antonino de Bivona-Bernardi (c. 1774–1837), Sicilian botanist, bryologist and phycologist
Antonino de Forciglioni (1389–1459), Roman Catholic Archbishop of Florence and saint
Antonino De Rosa (born 1981), American Magic: The Gathering player
Antonino Diana (c. 1586–1663), Sicilian Catholic moral theologian
Antonino Dos Santos Baptista (1933–2013), Portuguese professional racing cyclist
Antonino Faà di Bruno (1910–1981), Italian actor and former military officer
Antonino Fernández Rodríguez (1917–2016), Spanish businessman
Antonino Fogliani (born 1976), Italian conductor
Antonino Foti (born 1962), Italian softball coach
Antonino Gandolfo (1841–1910), Italian painter
Antonino Gandolfo Brancaleone (1820–1888), Italian composer
Antonino Giuffrè (born 1945), Italian mafioso
Antonino Grano (1660–1718), Italian painter and engraver
Antonino Isordia (born 1873), Mexican film and documentary director
Antonino La Gumina (born 1996), Italian footballer
Antonino Leto (1844–1913), Italian painter
Antonino Lo Surdo (1880–1949), Italian physicist
Antonino Paone (born 1955), Italian-American actor
Antonino Parrinello (born 1988), Italian cyclist
Antonino Paternò Castello, Marchese di San Giuliano (1852–1914), Italian diplomat
Antonino Profeta (born 1988), Italian footballer
Antonino Ragusa (born 1990), Italian footballer
Antonino Raspanti (born 1959), Italian Roman Catholic bishop
Antonino Rocca (1921–1977), Italian-Argentinian professional wrestler
Antonino Rocchetti Torres (1851–1934), Italian painter
Antonino P. Roman (1939–2014), Filipino politician
Antonino Russo Giusti (1876–1957), Italian dramatist
Antonino Sabino (1591–1650), Italian composer and priest
Antonino Saetta (1922-1988), Italian magistrate, assassinated by Cosa Nostra together with his son Stefano.
Antonino Saviano (born 1984), Italian footballer
Antonino Scopelliti (1935–1991), Italian magistrate killed by the Mafia
Antonino Souza-Kordyeru (born 1993), Russian pair skater
Antonino Spadaccino (born 1983), Italian singer
Antonino Maria Stromillo (1786–1858), Italian Roman Catholic bishop
Antonino Terzo (1923–2005), Italian actor
Antonino Toscano (1883–1941), Italian admiral during World War II
Antonino Tringali-Casanova (1888–1943), Italian politician, Minister of Justice of the Italian Social Republic
Antonino Votto (1896–1985), Italian operatic conductor and vocal coach
Antonino Zichichi (born 1929), Italian physicist

Surname
Darlene Antonino-Custodio (born 1973), Filipina politician
Luwalhati Antonino (born 1943), Filipina politician
Magnolia Antonino (1915–2010), Filipina politician

See also

Antoniano (disambiguation)
Antonijo
Antonin (name)
Antonina (name)
Antonine (name)
Antonini (name)
Antoninho (name)
Antoninów (disambiguation)
Antoniny (disambiguation)
Antonio
Antoñito (name)

Notes

Surnames
Italian masculine given names